Toboali is a town in the Indonesian province of Bangka-Belitung, Indonesia. Toboali is the capital of the South Bangka Regency.

Economy

Significant numbers of the townspeople are employed in pepper cultivation. In the New Order era, tin mining was extensive across the province and a large number of the locals were employed either by the large tin mining corporations or by unconventional mines.

The tourism sector have been growing in the recent years. Tourist destinations include a Dutch-era fortress and the city's natural beaches. In 2016, the local government for the first time held a cultural carnival, aimed to increase the number of tourists coming to the town.

Demographics
The majority of the people in Toboali are Hakka Chinese and Malay. Majority of Chinese are Buddhist, Catholic or Protestant.

Climate
Toboali has a tropical rainforest climate (Af) with heavy rainfall year-round.

References

Populated places in the Bangka Belitung Islands
Regency seats of the Bangka Belitung Islands
Districts of South Bangka Regency